Aksu is a town and district of Isparta Province in the Mediterranean region of Turkey. The population is 1,947 as of 2010.

References

External links
 District governor's official website 

Towns in Turkey
Populated places in Isparta Province
Aksu District (Isparta)